Joanna is a 1968 British drama film, directed by Michael Sarne and set in swinging London. It was nominated for the  Golden Globe for Best Foreign Language Film.

Plot
Joanna, a wide-eyed somewhat naïve art student in London, has a romantic fling with her teacher, aspiring painter Hendrik Casson. She eventually leaves him for impoverished Dominic, while her gold-digging friend Beryl takes up with the quite wealthy Lord Sanderson.

They travel to Sanderson's second home in Morocco, where he reveals that he has a terminal illness and sponsors an exhibit of Hendrik's paintings. Meanwhile, Dominic dumps Joanna because she refuses to stop seeing other men.

Joanna's next lover, Beryl's brother Gordon, impregnates her. Beaten by criminals to whom he is in debt, Gordon takes revenge by killing one. He is convicted of murder and sent to prison, leaving Joanna alone.

Cast
 Geneviève Waïte as Joanna 
 Christian Doermer as Hendrik Casson
 Calvin Lockhart as Gordon
 Donald Sutherland as Lord Peter Sanderson
 Glenna Forster-Jones as Beryl
 David Scheur as Dominic Endersley
 Marda Vanne as Granny
 Geoffrey Morris as The Father
 Michelle Cook as Margot
 Manning Wilson as Inspector
 Clifton Jones as Black Detective
 Dan Caulfield as White Detective
 Michael Chow as Lefty
 Anthony Ainley as Bruce
 Jane Bradbury as Angela
 Fiona Lewis as Miranda De Hyde
 Michael Sarne as Film Director
 Caroline Munro, uncredited

Production
Sarne had an affair with Waïte during the making of the film and was physically violent towards her during the shoot. In a 1968 interview with New York magazine, he said that hitting Waïte was "the only way to direct this girl, otherwise she's very cheeky. She has to be shown. I mean she knew that unless she behaved herself she'd get slapped down. One is polite to girls so long as they behave themselves". He continued saying he "didn't punch her around as corrective punishment. Only when she annoyed me".

Waïte was paid £2,000 for her work on the film.

Candice Bergen filmed a small scene but it was not included in the final cut due to problems with the studio, 20th Century Fox, and Equity, the British actors' union, because Bergen did not have work permit.

In a 1968 article in The Illustrated London News about film financing in the United Kingdom, Robert Lacey highlighted Joanna as an example of a British film that should have received financing from British rather than American companies. Sarne said that "With an American company you're artistically free … To make a good film you need a touch of the romantic, a streak of the visionary, and you can't have that with your financier tripping over your heels all the time".

Premiere
It was listed to compete at the 1968 Cannes Film Festival. The festival was cancelled due to the events of May 1968 in France. The film was still shown in an afternoon performance and a premier showing at Cannes.

Box office
According to Fox records, the film required $3,800,000 in rentals to break even, and by 11 December 1970 had made $1,900,000.

References

External links

British Film Institute; Joanna (1968)
 Glenna Forster-Jones in vintage Euro tv commercial

1968 films
1968 drama films
British drama films
Films directed by Michael Sarne
Films produced by Michael Laughlin
Films set in London
Films set in Morocco
20th Century Fox films
1960s English-language films
1960s British films